"Follow You Follow Me" is a love song written and recorded by English rock band Genesis. It was released in March 1978 as the first single from their ninth studio album, ...And Then There Were Three... (1978). The music was composed by the band, and the lyrics were written by bassist and guitarist Mike Rutherford. The single became Genesis' first top 10 hit in the UK and first top 40 hit in the US, reaching No. 7 and No. 23 respectively.

Background
Like much of the rest of the album, the slower, sentimental "Follow You Follow Me" was a departure from most of their previous work as a progressive rock band, featuring a simple melody, romantic lyrics and a verse-chorus structure. Although previous albums contained love ballads, such as Selling England by the Pound'''s "More Fool Me" and "Your Own Special Way" from Wind & Wuthering (1976), "Follow You Follow Me" was the first worldwide pop success by the group. The band felt that their music was attracting mainly male audiences, so this song was written specifically to address the imbalance.

Composition
The song started from a chord sequence by Rutherford, who also said he wrote the lyrics in about ten minutes. At the time, the band usually wrote songs individually. Keyboardist Tony Banks was quoted:

It was our only truly group-written number. Mike played the riff, then I started playing a chord sequence and melody line on it, which Phil then centralized around. It worked so well as a very simple thing; it was enough as it stood. I'd just written a simple love lyric for "Many Too Many", and I think Mike was keen to try the same thing. Maybe "Follow You Follow Me" was almost too banal, but I got used to it. I think we find it much easier to write long stories than simple love songs.

Drummer and vocalist Phil Collins described it as "a great rhythm track" but said it "was not intended to be a hit single".Record World called it an "engaging song" that has a "light, flowing sound."

Chart performance
At the time of release, "Follow You Follow Me" became the band's most successful single, reaching #7 on the UK Singles chart, peaking at #23 on the U.S. Billboard Hot 100, #23 on the U.S. Cashbox Top 100 chart  and #21 on the Adult Contemporary chart, #16 on the Australian singles charts, and #22 on the NZ singles charts. 
The song is included in the 2005 book, Rock Song Index: The 7500 Most Important Songs for the Rock and Roll Era, which states "the formerly progressive Genesis begins to proceed without impediment toward the Top 10".

Music video
The music video for the song was a mimed live performance of the band filmed at Shepperton Studios. It later appeared on their DVD The Video Show (2004). In the video Banks is wearing a Vancouver Canucks hockey team sweater. The main scene has Collins using a shaker-type instrument while singing, but he was also separately filmed playing the drums.

Live performances
"Follow You Follow Me" was played live during the …And Then There Were Three…, Duke, Three Sides Live Encore tour, Genesis, Invisible Touch (1986 set only), Calling All Stations (with Ray Wilson on vocals), and Turn It On Again tours. An excerpt of the song was also played on the We Can't Dance Tour, as part of an "Old Medley" of Genesis songs. The band would include the song as the last song in their acoustic set for The Last Domino? Tour, following "That's All" and "The Lamb Lies Down on Broadway".

During the Turn It On Again Tour, Collins performed on the drums as well as the vocals (making it one of very few songs in which he performs both simultaneously), while animated line art of a selection of the band's album art played in the background video screens. The first and last scenes in the animated sequence show the "father" character from the We Can't Dance album cover, raising his hand. A bright white spotlight (on Collins) lights up at the beginning of the song, and turns itself off at the end.

The song was also performed live on Collins' solo Not Dead Yet Tour, as well as by Mike + the Mechanics (with Tim Howar on vocals) during their Out of the Blue tour and on Ray Wilson's solo tours.

Personnel
Phil Collins – vocals, drums, percussion
Tony Banks – keyboards
Mike Rutherford – guitar, bass guitar

In popular culture
A cover of the song by the group Vapor and the singer Adaline is used in the short promotional film Lily and the Snowman'' by the Canadian theater chain Cineplex, which was shown in its theaters before any main feature in 2015.

References

External links
 

1978 singles
Genesis (band) songs
Rock ballads
Songs written by Phil Collins
Songs written by Tony Banks (musician)
Songs written by Mike Rutherford
1978 songs
Atlantic Records singles
Virgin Records singles
Charisma Records singles